Hemichromis lifalili, common name blood-red jewel cichlid, is a species of fish in the family Cichlidae.

Description
They are red-orange or bright red with rows of small blue spots all over the body, the head and fins. Two dark spots are present on the sides, the first on the opercle, the second in the middle of the body, while they lack the dark spot at the base of the tail present in Hemichromis bimaculatus.

In the mating period almost the whole body is red. Outside the spawning season adult males and females can be distinguished mainly by their body shape. The females are much leaner and show a brighter red. The males are much stronger and have a more massive head than females.

Diet
These fishes mainly feeds on worms, crustaceans, insects, small fish, but also on vegetable matter.

Reproduction
This species, as the more common and congener Hemichromis bimaculatus, is a popular aquarium fish and it is widespread commercially for breeding in the aquarium. Reproduction is quite simple and it is carried easily in captivity.

Usually, the female lays about 400 eggs on a stone and the male immediately fertilizes them. At a temperature of 25.5 °C, after 48 hours they hatch. After five and a half days, the fry swims freely and are led mainly by the female, while the male is mainly engaged in the defense of the territory.

Distribution and habitat
This species is present in The Democratic Republic of the Congo, the Lower and Central Congo River basin, except from the Shaba (Katanga) and Kasaï regions. These fishes prefers rocky and warm watercourses (22–24 °C). In oxygen-depleted waters, in rapids and in swampy habitats this species is missing.

Bibliography
 Loiselle, P. V. 1979. A revision of the genus Hemichromis Peters 1858 (Teleostei: Cichlidae). 1. – The Hemichromis fasciatus species group 2. – The Hemichromis bimaculatus species group 3. – The Hemichromis guttatus species group. 4 – The Hemichromis letourneaux species group. Annales du Musee Royal de l'Afrique Centrale Serie 8 Zoologie No. 228: 1–124.
 Daget, J. and G.G. Teugels, 1991. Hemichromis. p. 187-194. In J. Daget, J.-P. Gosse, G.G. Teugels and D.F.E. Thys van den Audenaerde (eds.) Check-list of the freshwater fishes of Africa, CLOFFA, ISNB, Brussels; MRAC, Tervuren; and ORSTOM, Paris. Vol. 4.
 Hans A. Baensch, Rüdiger Riehl: Aquarien Atlas. 1. Band, 15. Auflage. Mergus, Melle 2006, .
 Axelrod, H. R., 1993. The most complete colored lexicon of cichlids. T.F.H. Publications, Neptune City (USA).
 Goldstein, R.J.: Cichlids of the world.T.F.H. Publications Inc. Neptune City, New Jersey, USA.
 Helfman, G., B. Collette i D. Facey: The diversity of fishes. Blackwell Science, Malden, Massachusetts USA, 1997.
 Moyle, P. i J. Cech.: Fishes: An Introduction to Ichthyology, 4th ed., Upper Saddle River, New Jersey, USA: Prentice-Hall. 2000.
 Nelson, J.: Fishes of the World, 3rd. ed.. New York, USA: John Wiley and Sons. Any 1994.
Römer U.: Cichliden Atlas, Bd. 1. Melle. 1311 p. 1998.
 Teugels, G.G. i D.F.E. Thys van den Audenaerde, 1992. Cichlidae. p. 714-779. A: C. Levêque, * D. Paugy, G.G. Teugels (eds.) Faune des poissons d'eaux douces et saumâtres d'Afrique de l'Ouest. Vol. 2. Coll. Faune Tropicale núm 28. Musée Royal de l'Afrique Centrale, Tervuren, – O.R.S.T.O.M., Paris, 902 p.
 Wheeler, A.: The World Encyclopedia of Fishes, 2nd. Ed., London: Macdonald. 985

References

lifalili
Taxa named by Paul V. Loiselle
Fish described in 1979
Endemic fauna of the Democratic Republic of the Congo